John Basilone (November 4, 1916 – February 19, 1945) was a United States Marine Corps Gunnery Sergeant who received the Medal of Honor for actions during the Battle for Henderson Field in the Guadalcanal campaign, and the Navy Cross posthumously for extraordinary heroism during the Battle of Iwo Jima. He was the only enlisted Marine to receive both of these decorations in World War II.

He enlisted in the Marine Corps on June 3, 1940, after serving three years in the United States Army with duty in the Philippines. He was deployed to Guantánamo Bay, Cuba, and in August 1942, he took part in the invasion of Guadalcanal. In October, he and the two machine-gun sections under his command held off an attack by a numerically far superior Japanese force. He was one of only three Marines in that group to survive. His actions at Guadalcanal earned him the Medal of Honor. 

In February 1945, he was killed in action on the first day of the invasion of Iwo Jima, after he single-handedly destroyed an enemy blockhouse and led a Marine tank under fire safely through a minefield. Including the Medal of Honor, he has received many honors, including having base streets, military facilities, and two United States Navy destroyers named for him.

Early life and education

Basilone was born in his Italian American parents' home on November 4, 1916, in Buffalo, New York. He was the sixth of ten children. His five older siblings were born in Raritan, New Jersey, before the family moved to Buffalo where John was born; they returned to Raritan in 1918. Basilone's mother, Theadora Bencivenga, was born in 1889 and grew up in Manville, New Jersey, but her parents, Carlo and Catrina, also came from Benevento. Basilone's parents met at a church gathering and married three years later.

Basilone grew up in the nearby Raritan Town (now Borough of Raritan) where he attended St. Bernard Parochial School. After completing middle school at age 15, he dropped out prior to attending high school. Basilone worked as a golf caddy for the local country club before joining the military.

Military service

U.S. Army
Basilone enlisted in the United States Army in July 1934 and completed his three-year enlistment with service in the Philippines, where he was a champion boxer. In the Army, Basilone was initially assigned to the 16th Infantry at Fort Jay, New York, before being discharged for a day, reenlisting, and being assigned to the 31st Infantry.

After he was released from active duty, Basilone returned home and worked as a truck driver in Reisterstown, Maryland. After driving trucks for a few years, he wanted to go back to Manila and believed he could get there faster by serving in the Marine Corps rather than in the Army.

U.S. Marine Corps
He enlisted in the Marine Corps in 1940, in Baltimore, Maryland. He went to recruit training at Marine Corps Recruit Depot Parris Island, followed by training at Marine Corps Base Quantico and New River. The Marines sent him to Guantánamo Bay for his next assignment and then to Guadalcanal in the Solomon Islands as a member of "D" Company, 1st Battalion, 7th Marines, 1st Marine Division.

Guadalcanal
On October 24, 1942, during the Battle for Henderson Field, his unit came under attack by a regiment of about 3,000 soldiers from the Japanese Sendai Division using machine guns, grenades, and mortars against the American heavy machine guns. Basilone commanded two sections of machine guns which fought for the next two days until only Basilone and two other Marines were left standing. As the battle went on, ammunition became critically low. Despite their supply lines having been cut off by enemies who had infiltrated into the rear, Basilone fought through hostile ground to resupply his heavy machine gunners with urgently needed supplies.  Basilone moved an extra gun into position and maintained continual fire against the incoming Japanese forces. He then repaired and manned another machine gun, holding the defensive line until relief arrived.

When the last of the ammunition ran out shortly before dawn on the second day, Basilone, using his pistol and a machete, held off the Japanese soldiers attacking his position. By the end of the engagement, Japanese forces opposite the Marines' lines had been virtually annihilated. For his actions during the battle, Basilone received the United States military's highest award for valor, the Medal of Honor. Afterwards, Private First Class Nash W. Phillips of Fayetteville, North Carolina, recalled from the battle for Guadalcanal:

War bond tours 
In 1943, Basilone returned to the United States and participated in war bond tours. His arrival was highly publicized, and his hometown held a parade in his honor when he returned. The homecoming parade occurred on Sunday, September 19 and drew a huge crowd with thousands of people, including politicians, celebrities, and the national press. The parade made national news in Life magazine and Fox Movietone News. After the parade, Basilone toured the country raising money for the war effort and achieved celebrity status.

Although he appreciated the admiration, he felt out of place and requested to return to the operating forces fighting the war. The Marine Corps denied his request and told him he was needed more on the home front.  He was offered a commission, which he turned down, and was later offered an assignment as an instructor, but refused this as well. When he requested again to return to the war, the request was approved. He left for Camp Pendleton, California, for training on December 27. On July 3, 1944, he reenlisted in the Marine Corps.

Marriage
While stationed at Camp Pendleton, Basilone met his future wife, Lena Mae Riggi, who was a sergeant in the Marine Corps Women's Reserve.  They were married at St. Mary's Star of the Sea Church in Oceanside, California, on July 10, 1944, with a reception at the Carlsbad Hotel. They honeymooned at an onion farm near Portland, Oregon.

Iwo Jima and death

After his request to return to the fleet was approved, Basilone was assigned to "C" Company, 1st Battalion, 27th Marine Regiment, 5th Marine Division. On February 19, 1945, the first day of the invasion of Iwo Jima, he was serving as a machine gun section leader on Red Beach II. While the Marines landed, the Japanese concentrated their fire at the incoming Marines from heavily fortified blockhouses staged throughout the island. With his unit pinned down, Basilone made his way around the side of the Japanese positions until he was directly on top of the blockhouse. He then attacked with grenades and demolitions, single-handedly destroying the entire strong point and its defending garrison.

He then fought his way toward Airfield Number 1 and aided a Marine tank that was trapped in an enemy mine field under intense mortar and artillery barrages. He guided the heavy vehicle over the hazardous terrain to safety, despite heavy weapons fire from the Japanese. As he moved along the edge of the airfield, he was killed by Japanese mortar shrapnel (based on his research for the book and miniseries The Pacific, author Hugh Ambrose suggested that Basilone was killed by a burst of small arms fire which hit him in the right groin and neck and nearly took off his left arm).

His actions helped Marines penetrate the Japanese defense and get off the landing beach during the critical early stages of the invasion. Basilone was posthumously awarded the Marine Corps' second-highest decoration for valor, the Navy Cross, for extraordinary heroism during the battle of Iwo Jima.

Burial
He was buried at Arlington National Cemetery, in Arlington, Virginia. His widow, Lena M. Basilone, died on June 11, 1999, aged 86, and is buried at Riverside National Cemetery in Riverside, California. Lena's obituary notes that she never remarried and was buried still wearing her wedding ring.

Awards and decorations
Gunnery Sergeant Basilone's military awards include:

Medal of Honor citation
Basilone's Medal of Honor citation reads as follows:

The President of the United States in the name of The Congress takes pride in presenting the MEDAL OF HONOR to

for service as set forth in the following CITATION:

For extraordinary heroism and conspicuous gallantry in action against enemy Japanese forces, above and beyond the call of duty, while serving with the 1st Battalion, 7th Marines, 1st Marine Division in the Lunga Area, Guadalcanal, Solomon Islands, on 24 and 25 October 1942. While the enemy was hammering at the Marines' defensive positions, Sgt. BASILONE, in charge of 2 sections of heavy machine guns, fought valiantly to check the savage and determined assault. In a fierce frontal attack with the Japanese blasting his guns with grenades and mortar fire, one of Sgt. BASILONE'S sections, with its gun crews, was put out of action, leaving only 2 men able to carry on. Moving an extra gun into position, he placed it in action, then, under continual fire, repaired another and personally manned it, gallantly holding his line until replacements arrived. A little later, with ammunition critically low and the supply lines cut off, Sgt. BASILONE, at great risk of his life and in the face of continued enemy attack, battled his way through hostile lines with urgently needed shells for his gunners, thereby contributing in large measure to the virtual annihilation of a Japanese regiment. His great personal valor and courageous initiative were in keeping with the highest traditions of the U.S. Naval Service.

Navy Cross citation
Basilone's Navy Cross citation reads as follows:

The President of the United States takes pride in presenting the NAVY CROSS posthumously to

for service as set forth in the following CITATION:

For extraordinary heroism while serving as a Leader of a Machine-Gun Section, Company C, 1st Battalion, 27th Marines, 5th Marine Division, in action against enemy Japanese forces on Iwo Jima in the Volcano Islands, 19 February 1945. Shrewdly gauging the tactical situation shortly after landing when his company's advance was held up by the concentrated fire of a heavily fortified Japanese blockhouse, Gunnery Sergeant BASILONE boldly defied the smashing bombardment of heavy caliber fire to work his way around the flank and up to a position directly on top of the blockhouse and then, attacking with grenades and demolitions, single handedly destroyed the entire hostile strong point and its defending garrison. Consistently daring and aggressive as he fought his way over the battle-torn beach and up the sloping, gun-studded terraces toward Airfield Number 1, he repeatedly exposed himself to the blasting fury of exploding shells and later in the day coolly proceeded to the aid of a friendly tank which had been trapped in an enemy mine field under intense mortar and artillery barrages, skillfully guiding the heavy vehicle over the hazardous terrain to safety, despite the overwhelming volume of hostile fire. In the forefront of the assault at all times, he pushed forward with dauntless courage and iron determination until, moving upon the edge of the airfield, he fell, instantly killed by a bursting mortar shell. Stouthearted and indomitable, Gunnery Sergeant BASILONE, by his intrepid initiative, outstanding skill, and valiant spirit of self-sacrifice in the face of the fanatic opposition, contributed materially to the advance of his company during the early critical period of the assault, and his unwavering devotion to duty throughout the bitter conflict was an inspiration to his comrades and reflects the highest credit upon Gunnery Sergeant BASILONE and the United States Naval Service. He gallantly gave his life in the service of his country.

Other honors
Basilone received numerous honors, including the following:

Marine Corps
 An entry point onto Camp Pendleton from US Interstate 5 is called "Basilone Road"
 US Interstate 5 from the San Diego County line to Camp Pendleton to the south is called "Gunnery Sergeant John Basilone Memorial Highway"
 A parachute landing zone at Camp Pendleton is called "Basilone Drop Zone"
 During the Crucible portion of Marine Corps Recruit Training at Marine Corps Recruit Depot San Diego, there is an obstacle named "Basilone's Challenge" that consists of carrying ammunition cans filled with concrete up a steep, wooded hill

Navy
The ship's keel was laid down on July 7, 1945, in Orange, Texas, and launched on December 21, 1945. His widow, Sergeant Lena Mae Basilone, sponsored the ship.
 A plaque at the United States Navy Memorial in Washington, D.C.
  The  was laid down in January 2020.

Public
 In 1944, Army Barracks from Washington state were moved to a site in front of Hansen Dam in Pacoima, California, and rebuilt as 1,500 apartments for returning soldiers. This development was named the "Basilone Homes" and was used until about 1955. The site is now a golf course.

 The memorial parade for Basilone along Somerset Street in his hometown of Raritan, New Jersey, has been held since 1981.
 At Montclair State University, a residence hall is named after him.
 At Bridgewater-Raritan High School, the football field is called "Basilone Field". On the wall of the fieldhouse next to the field is a mural honoring Basilone. The annual Basilone Bowl, presented by the Somerset County Football Coaches Association and the Marine Corps, is a football game played by select seniors from Somerset County, New Jersey and supported by select cheerleaders from Somerset County and played on Basilone Field, and began in 2012.
 The Knights of Columbus Council #13264 in his hometown is named in his honor.
 An overpass at the Somerville Circle in Somerville, New Jersey, on U.S. Highway 202 and 206 that goes under it, is named for Basilone.
 The New Jersey Turnpike bridge across the Raritan River is named the "Basilone Bridge."
 A connector road at the southwest of Newark Liberty International Airport, that connects to Earhart Drive, is named after Basilone.
 The John Basilone Veterans Memorial Bridge crosses the Raritan River, in Raritan, New Jersey, at First Avenue and Canal Street.
 In 1948, the John Basilone American Legion Post dedicated a memorial statue at the intersections of Old York Road and Canal Street in Raritan. The statue, featuring Basilone holding a water-cooled Browning machine gun, was sculpted by Phillip Orlando, a childhood friend.
 A bust of Basilone is sited at Piazza Basilone, in Little Italy, San Diego, at Fir and India Streets. The war memorial there is dedicated to residents of Little Italy who served in World War II and Korean War.
 The Order of the Sons of Italy In America Lodge #2442 in Bohemia, New York, is named in his honor.
 The Basilone Room in Raritan Public Library is where memorabilia about him is kept.
 On November 10, 2005, the United States Postal Service issued "Distinguished Marines" stamps honoring four Marine Corps heroes, including Basilone.
 In 2011, Basilone was inducted into the New Jersey Hall of Fame.

In media
 The film First to Fight (1967) features Chad Everett as "Shanghai Jack" Connell, a character based on "Manila John" Basilone.
 The 10-part HBO miniseries The Pacific (2010) is based on the intertwined stories of Basilone and two other Marines (Robert "Lucky" Leckie and Eugene "Sledgehammer" Sledge). Actor Jon Seda plays Basilone.

See also
 List of historically notable United States Marines
 List of Medal of Honor recipients for World War II

References

Citations

General sources

Further reading

External links

 
 
 
 United States Marine Corps History Division Gunnery Sergeant John Basilone Biography
 
 Medal of Honor Recipients Depicted in Film

1916 births
1945 deaths
American male boxers
United States Marine Corps personnel killed in World War II
American people of Italian descent
Battle of Iwo Jima
Burials at Arlington National Cemetery
Military personnel from Buffalo, New York
People from Raritan, New Jersey
People from Reistertown, Maryland
Recipients of the Navy Cross (United States)
United States Army soldiers
United States Marine Corps non-commissioned officers
United States Marine Corps Medal of Honor recipients
World War II recipients of the Medal of Honor
Military personnel from New Jersey
Military personnel from Maryland